Francesco Scardina (born 11 December 1981 in Rivalta di Torino) is an Italian former footballer who played as a defender.

Club career
Born in Rivalta di Torino, Scardina started his career with hometown giant Juventus. After being promoted from the youth team, he joined Serie C1 team Cesena on loan. In January 2002, he was called back to Turin as a backup player. He played as an unused substitute in two UEFA Champions League matches. In the following season, he was loaned to PAOK then played for L'Aquila.

In 2003, he joined F.C. Crotone in Serie C1 in a co-ownership deal. He played all 4 promotion playoffs and won. He followed the team to play in Serie B and played 16 matches. At the end of the season, Crotone bought the remaining registration rights from Juventus. In the 2005–06 season, he played 12 league matches before joining Vicenza in January 2006. With Vicenza he played 69 league matches in 3 Serie B seasons. He then joined Chievo on free transfer. For the newly promoted Serie A team, he played 11 league matches in 2008–09 season, 9 of which as a starter.

International career
Scardina played for Italy U-18 team in the 2000 UEFA European Under-18 Football Championship qualification.

References

External links
Profile at Football.it 
Profile at La Gazzetta dello Sport 
Profile at FIGC  

Italian footballers
Italy youth international footballers
Italian expatriate footballers
Juventus F.C. players
A.C. Cesena players
L'Aquila Calcio 1927 players
PAOK FC players
F.C. Crotone players
L.R. Vicenza players
A.C. ChievoVerona players
A.S. Cittadella players
A.S.G. Nocerina players
Serie A players
Serie B players
Expatriate footballers in Greece
Italian expatriate sportspeople in Greece
Association football defenders
Sportspeople from the Metropolitan City of Turin
1981 births
Living people
Footballers from Piedmont